Easthope is a civil parish in Shropshire, England.  It contains five listed buildings that are recorded in the National Heritage List for England.  Of these, one is at Grade II*, the middle of the three grades, and the others are at Grade II, the lowest grade.  The parish contains the village of Easthope and the surrounding countryside.  All the listed buildings are in the village, and consist of a church, three houses, and a malthouse.


Key

Buildings

References

Citations

Sources

Lists of buildings and structures in Shropshire